Ibn Sina Mosque, or la mosque Avicenne, is located in Montpellier, France, in the neighborhood of Petit Bard. Situated in the South of France, the Ibn Sina mosque is managed and run by a group of Algerian nationals from the association for the knowledge of Arab culture.

Description
Ibn Sina mosque is the largest mosque in Montpellier with a capacity of 2,000 people and is expandable to 3,000 persons with the outdoor courtyard. The mosque draws a mix of Muslim believers from the deeply traditional to the radical. The management, since its opening over 20 years ago, has been in the hands of a father-and-son duo who have served as successive presidents. A lease signed between the mayor, Helene Mandrous, and the mosque leaders in 2013 was for a period of 50 years.

The Ibn Sina mosque holds prayers five times a day in addition to sermons on Friday. The imam of the mosque is Ahmed Keddari. The official language of the mosque is Modern Standard Arabic, also known as fusha, and despite its location, no sermons are held in French. There is a separate room for women in the mosque and Arabic courses are organized by the teaching staff.

History
In 2014, Ibn Sina mosque attendees protested the mosque president Tahar Nedromi along with the association managing the mosque saying that the activities going on in the mosque were suspicious and calling the leadership of the mosque a dictatorship. In February, followers at the mosque and members of the cultural association clashed when followers accused the president of mafia administration and of questionable management of mosque funds. Mosque members were upset that the mosque had been under the authority and power of a father (Khatir) and son (Tahrir) for over 20 years while neither had been elected to the post by members of the community. Anger from the community originally stemmed from the signing by the father and son of the 50-year lease with the city in 2013 that included an unfair clause to Muslims in Montpellier; the lease stipulated that 4 million euros must be invested into the facilities through beautification projects. If the terms were not met, then the city could break the lease and recover the property.

The lease stipulated that grants to the city council and the region must be paid every year and the members of the Ibn Sina mosque had no idea where their money was going. In addition to the problems with the lease, members of the mosque protested against Tahar Nedromi specifically, accusing him of faking and forging documents. Community members allege that the president signed the lease on behalf of a board of directors that does not exist. An article was published in which a mosque member argued that, while their brothers and sisters were fighting for their rights in the Arab world, people in France had rights and therefore should not be subjected to the Arab dictatorship that the Nedromi family created inside Ibn Sina mosque. Members expressed outrage that the Muslim community has no say in who runs the mosque. Members maintain that the current president only cares about maintaining his own power. Members further complained that the president and his father have no religions knowledge or skill but committed members of the mosque to accepting their rule without question. Legal proceedings against the president began in this year.

In July 2015, during Ramadan, tensions were again sparked within the mosque. Dozens of worshippers demonstrated, for the second time, after prayer, against mosque president Tahar Nedromi. They accused Nedromi of corruption and financial mismanagement of the mosque. Tensions escalated into a series of altercations between leadership and mosque members. During this time it was reported that the mosque imam had disappeared, but he had travelled to Algeria for Ramadan.

Conservative members of the "Association of Citizens for Montpellier" soon joined the protest, arguing that the Muslims in Petit Bard created an atmosphere of poison around the mosque, and that suspicious behaviors were increasing in and around the mosque in recent years. They also argued that the president of Ibn Sina mosque was involved in financial corruption.

That same month, several families from the neighborhood of Petit Bard, who were members of Ibn Sina mosque, were arrested in conjunction with an investigation into the jihadists sector of Syria. In the first week of July 2015, members of the domestic surveillance and intelligence police conducted secret investigations into allegations of Ibn Sina mosque members who planned to travel to Syria to fight with the jihadists. Several families in Petit Bard were arrested and taken to the regional directorate of domestic surveillance on the first floor of the police station, where they were held in custody. Family members, including young children, had allegedly been radicalized inside the mosque according to information gathered by the police. Investigations interrupted the preparations for their departure to Syria.

References

Algerian diaspora in France
Arab-French culture
Buildings and structures in Montpellier
Mosques in France